The W (Western and Paddington) postcode area, also known as the London W postcode area is a group of postcode districts covering part of central and part of West London, England. The area originates from the Western (W1) and Paddington (W2-14) districts of the London postal district. This area covers 35 postcode districts and around 18,554 live postcodes.

Postal administration
The Western district consists of the single original W1 postal district. The area that it covers is high-density and so has been subdivided into a number of smaller postcode districts. When districts are used for purposes other than the sorting of mail, such as use as a geographic reference and on street signs, the W1 subdivisions continue to be classed as one 'district'. In June 2000, there was a recoding of the area, with the W1M, W1N, W1P, W1R, W1V, W1X and W1Y districts being replaced.

The mail centre for W1 is London Central, and that for W2-14 is Greenford.

Deliveries for W1 (and for WC1 and WC2) came from the Western District Office on Rathbone Place until it was decommissioned. It was a stop on the former London Post Office Railway, which has been mothballed since 2003. The Western District Office was initially on Wimpole Street, which was also a stop on the London Post Office Railway.

The Paddington district has 13 postcode districts (W2–14). Other than W2, the districts are arranged alphabetically, run from W3 (Acton) to W14 (West Kensington) and radiate westwards. The Paddington Head District Sorting Office was the western terminus of the London Post Office Railway, which ran  to the Eastern District Office, at Whitechapel.

List of postcode districts
The approximate coverage of the postcode districts, with the historic postal district names shown in italics:
<onlyinclude> 
|-
! W1A
| LONDON
| PO boxes & Admail codes in W1
| non-geographic
|-
! W1B
| LONDON
| Portland Place, Regent Street
| Westminster
|-
! W1C
| LONDON
| Oxford Street (west)
| Westminster
|-
! W1D
| LONDON
| Soho (south east); Chinatown, Soho Square
| Westminster
|-
! W1F
| LONDON
| Soho (north west)
| Westminster
|-
! W1G
| LONDON
| Harley Street
| Westminster
|-
! W1H
| LONDON
| Marylebone
| Westminster
|-
! W1J
| LONDON
| Mayfair (south), Piccadilly
| Westminster
|-
! W1K
| LONDON
| Mayfair (north), Grosvenor Square
| Westminster
|-
! W1S
| LONDON
| Mayfair (east), Hanover Square, Savile Row, Royal Academy
| Westminster
|-
! W1T
| LONDON
| Fitzrovia, Tottenham Court Road
| Camden
|-
! W1U
| LONDON
| Marylebone
| Westminster
|-
! W1W
| LONDON
| East Marylebone, Great Portland Street, Fitzrovia
| Westminster
|-
! W2
| LONDON
| Paddington head district: Paddington, Bayswater, Hyde Park, Westbourne Green, Little Venice (part), Notting Hill (part) || Westminster, Kensington and Chelsea
|-
! W3
| LONDON
| Acton district: Acton, West Acton, North Acton (part), South Acton, East Acton (west), Park Royal (south), Hanger Hill Garden Estate, Gunnersbury Park || Ealing, Hounslow, Hammersmith and Fulham
|-
! W4
| LONDON
| Chiswick district: Chiswick, Gunnersbury, Turnham Green, Acton Green, South Acton (part), Bedford Park || Hounslow, Ealing, Hammersmith and Fulham
|-
! W5
| LONDON
| Ealing district: Ealing, South Ealing, Ealing Common, North Ealing, Northfields, (south and east), Pitshanger, Hanger Lane || Ealing, Hounslow
|-
! W6
| LONDON
| Hammersmith district: Fulham, Hammersmith, Ravenscourt Park, Stamford Brook (part)|| Hammersmith and Fulham, Hounslow
|-
! W7
| LONDON
| Hanwell district: Hanwell, Boston Manor (part) || Ealing
|-
! W8
| LONDON
| Kensington district: Kensington, Holland Park (part) || Kensington and Chelsea
|-
! W9
| LONDON
| Maida Hill district: Maida Hill, Maida Vale, Queen's Park (part), West Kilburn || Westminster, Brent, Camden
|-
! W10
| LONDON
| Ladbroke Grove district: Kensal Town, Ladbroke Grove , Queen's Park (part) || Kensington and Chelsea, Westminster, Hammersmith and Fulham, Brent
|-
! W11
| LONDON
| Notting Hill district: Notting Hill, Ladbroke Grove (part), Holland Park (part) || Kensington and Chelsea, Westminster, Hammersmith and Fulham
|-
! W12
| LONDON
| Shepherds Bush district: Shepherd's Bush, White City, Wormwood Scrubs, East Acton (east) || Hammersmith and Fulham
|-
! W13
| LONDON
| West Ealing district: West Ealing, Northfields (north and west) || Ealing
|-
! W14
| LONDON
| West Kensington district: West Kensington, Kensington Olympia, Holland Park || Hammersmith and Fulham, Kensington and Chelsea
</onlyinclude> 
|}

Boundaries
Postcode districts W1 and W2 are central to London, and W3 to W14 are mostly further west. The boundaries of the area and its numbered districts have changed over time and are the result of the working requirements of the Royal Mail. The boundaries do not coincide with the local authority areas. W1 is almost entirely in the City of Westminster, with a small part in the London Borough of Camden. W2 to W14 cover the northwestern part of the City of Westminster, the northern parts of the Royal Borough of Kensington and Chelsea and the London Borough of Hammersmith and Fulham and the eastern parts of the London Boroughs of Ealing and Hounslow, as well as very small parts of the London Boroughs of Brent and Camden.

In popular culture
The TV series W1A'' satirises the goings-on at the BBC's Broadcasting House in Portland Place, whose memorable postcode is W1A 1AA.

AJ Tracey released the 2020 track "West Ten", which refers to the Ladbroke Grove area.

Map

See also
Postcode Address File
List of postcode areas in the United Kingdom
London postal district

References

External links
 Royal Mail's Postcode Address File
A quick introduction to Royal Mail's Postcode Address File (PAF)

Postcode areas covering London
Media and communications in the City of Westminster
Media and communications in the Royal Borough of Kensington and Chelsea
Media and communications in the London Borough of Ealing
Media and communications in the London Borough of Hammersmith and Fulham
Media and communications in the London Borough of Hounslow
Media and communications in the London Borough of Camden